Seng Han Thong (born 22 April 1950) is a Singaporean former politician. A member of the governing People's Action Party (PAP), he was a Member of Parliament representing the Yio Chu Kang ward of Ang Mo Kio GRC from 1997 to 2006, and Yio Chu Kang SMC from 2006 to 2011.

Education
Seng attended Tuan Mong High School (now Ngee Ann Secondary School), graduating in 1967. He holds a master's degree in Public Administration and Management from the Lee Kuan Yew School of Public Policy, National University of Singapore and a Master of Business Administration from the Henley Business School, Brunel University.

Career 
Afterwards, he held various jobs including as a sales representative for a watch company and a certified interpreter in the judicial system of Singapore. In 1974, he began a career in journalism, starting as a reporter for the Nanyang Siang Pau, then moving to the Lianhe Zaobao in 1982. From 1983 to 1984, he attended a management diploma course at the Singapore Institute of Management, while rising through the ranks at his new company. While studying for a MBA between 1990 and 1993 at Brunel University in London, he became deputy chief editor of the Lianhe Zaobao in 1992. He became the general manager of Singapore Press Holdings' Chinese newspaper division in 1996.

Political career 
Seng was first elected to parliament in 1997, representing the Ang Mo Kio Group Representation Constituency; he was returned to his seat in 2001, and then in 2006 was elected to represent the Yio Chu Kang Single Member Constituency.

In May 2006, Seng was attacked by a constituent of his, a 74-year-old disgruntled former taxi driver who felt that Seng was not taking any action to help him regain his lost taxi licence. The man later made a public apology to Seng, and the charges were dropped.

In January 2009, Seng suffered another attack by one of his constituents; a 70-year-old man set him on fire by pouring paint thinner on his back and then igniting him with a cigarette lighter. The man was believed to be mentally ill. Seng suffered burns to roughly 15 percent of his body, and received treatment at Singapore General Hospital. He took time off to recover from his injuries, and resumed his duties in July 2009.

In 2011, Seng became embroiled in a racism controversy when he posted comments online regarding the transit crisis in Singapore. He said on Blog TV.SG that "I noticed that the PR mentioned that some of the staff, because they are Malays, they are Indians, they can't converse in English well enough".

Seng retired from politics after August 2015.

References

External links
Member's Profile on the site of the Parliament of Singapore

1950 births
Alumni of Brunel University London
Living people
People's Action Party politicians
Singaporean people of Teochew descent
Singaporean Buddhists
Members of the Parliament of Singapore